The 2019–20 Israeli Premier League, also known as Ligat Tel Aviv Stock Exchange for sponsorship reasons, was the 21st season since its introduction in 1999 and the 78th season of top-tier football in Israel. The season began in August 2019 and concluded in July 2020 after a suspension of 75 days due to the coronavirus pandemic.

Teams

A total of fourteen teams were competing in the league, including twelve sides from the 2018–19 season and two promoted teams from the 2018–19 Liga Leumit.

Bnei Sakhnin and Maccabi Petah Tikva were relegated to the 2019–20 Liga Leumit after finishing the 2018–19 Israeli Premier League in the bottom two places.

Sektzia Ness Ziona were promoted as the winners of the 2018–19 Liga Leumit. This marked the return of Ness Ziona to the top division after 51 years of absence.

Hapoel Kfar Saba were promoted as the Runner-ups of the 2018–19 Liga Leumit. This ends the team's three years absence from the top division.

Stadiums and locations

Personnel and sponsorship

Foreign players

The number of foreign players is restricted to six per team, while only five can be registered to a game.

Managerial changes

Regular season

Regular season table

Regular season results

Source:

Championship round
Key numbers for pairing determination (number marks position after 26 games)

Due to 2 teams that play in the Sammy Ofer Stadium qualified to this round, and in order to insure that all the last games of this round, can be played in the same time (for purity reasons), the order of the games, has been changed, affecting fixtures 33, 35 and 36.

Championship round table

Championship round results

Positions by round

Relegation round
Key numbers for pairing determination (number marks position after 26 games)

Due to 2 teams that play in the HaMoshava Stadium qualified to this round, and in order to insure that all the last games of this round, can be played in the same time(for purity reasons), the order of the games, has been changed. Affecting fixtures 31 and 33.

Relegation round table

Relegation round results

Positions by round

Season statistics

Top scorers

Source: (Hebrew)

Top Assists

Source: (Hebrew)

Hat-tricks

Average attendances

References

External links
 uefa.com

Israeli Premier League seasons
1
Israel
Israel